Dennis Scott Little (born January 19, 1963) is an American former professional baseball outfielder. He played three games in Major League Baseball (MLB) for the Pittsburgh Pirates. He currently works for the Colorado Rockies in the Player Development Department.

Career
Little, an outfielder, played collegiate football and baseball at the University of Missouri. He played in the 1981 Tangerine Bowl and was drafted by the New York Mets in the 7th round of the 1984 Major League Baseball Draft, playing three seasons in their minor league organization. On May 29, 1987, Little was traded, along with Al Pedrique, to the Pittsburgh Pirates, in exchange for Bill Almon.  He played for the Pirates in three games in 1989, then played in the minors again until . He batted and threw right-handed, stood 6'0" tall and weighed 198 lbs.

Since his playing career, Little managed extensively in minor league baseball, beginning in 1992 with the Augusta Pirates of the South Atlantic League. He has managed in the farm systems of the Pirates, Dodgers, Washington Nationals, and Texas Rangers In addition, he spent 2009-2015 as an Area Scout with the Los Angeles Dodgers.

References

External links
, or Retrosheet
Pura Pelota (Venezuelan Winter League)

1963 births
Living people
Baseball coaches from Illinois
Baseball players from Illinois
Buffalo Bisons (minor league) players
Harrisburg Senators players
Jackson Mets players
Little Falls Mets players
Lynchburg Mets players
Los Angeles Dodgers scouts
Major League Baseball right fielders
Mineral Area Cardinals baseball players
Minor league baseball coaches
Minor league baseball managers
Missouri Tigers baseball players
Pittsburgh Pirates players
Salem Buccaneers players
Sportspeople from East St. Louis, Illinois
Tiburones de La Guaira players
American expatriate baseball players in Venezuela
University of Missouri alumni